The following is the discography of Kaytranada. Active since 2010, Kaytranada first released a series of mixtapes and original music under the name Kaytradamus. He released his first critically acclaimed studio album, 99.9%, in 2016, which he followed up with the Grammy-winner Bubba in 2019.

Albums

Studio albums

Mixtapes

Collaborative projects

Extended plays

Singles

As lead artist

As featured artist

Other charted songs

Other appearances 
Standalone tracks on compilations
 "Street Twister" on Artbeat Montreal: Brassures Du Terroir (ABMTL, December 6, 2011)
 "109" and "Kevin" with High Klassified on Piu Piu Beat Tape Vol. 1 (Piu Piu, May 10, 2012)
 "Black Mozart" feat. Green Hypnotic & Cyber on SandwichGallery 2 (a-La, January 11, 2013) (as part of The Celestics)
 "118" on Distant Minds 3 (LOAFLAB, July 7, 2013)
 "195" on XL Chapter VI  (XL Recordings, February 25, 2016)
 "Well I Bet Ya" on Gangster Music Vol. 1 (All City Records, 2019)

Remixes 
Official remix albums

Lavendar [Nightfall Remix] (Innovative Leisure Records, June 9, 2017) (original artist: BADBADNOTGOOD)
The ArtScience Remixes (Blue Note, April 21, 2018) (original artist: Robert Glasper)

Remix compilations

 Remixes Vol. 1 (January 1, 2012)
 Kaytranada RMX EP (September 4, 2013)

See also 

 Kaytranada production discography

References 

Electronic music discographies
Discographies of Canadian artists
Hip hop discographies